The Peugeot J9 is a van manufactured by Peugeot from January 1981 until 1991. It was also manufactured under license by commercial vehicles manufacturer Karsan in Turkey, from 1981 until 2010. After a facelift in 1991, in 2006, Karsan released the restyled J9 Premier. Production ended in 2010 when the J9 was replaced by the closely related Karsan J10.

When first introduced, the J9 had 1.6 or 2.0 litre petrol engines, or the Indenor diesel engines of 2.1 or 2.3 litres. Late in the French production run, the 2.5 litre diesel engine also became available.

References

External links

J9
Vans
Minibuses
Vehicles introduced in 1981